Stoney End is the twelfth studio album by Barbra Streisand. Released in 1971, it was a conscious change in direction for Streisand with a more upbeat contemporary pop/rock sound and was produced by Richard Perry. The album included cover versions of many songs by contemporary singer-songwriters of the day including Laura Nyro, Randy Newman and Joni Mitchell.

The album is one of the most successful albums of Streisand's career, being certified platinum by the RIAA for sales exceeding 1 million copies in the United States only. It also produced three hit singles on Billboard magazine's Hot 100 and Adult Contemporary charts: "Stoney End", "Time and Love" and "Flim Flam Man". The album peaked at #10 in the United States, her first to reach the top 10 in five years.

Production and release
In 1971, after the relative failure in sales of What About Today? Columbia Records continued with the desire to modernize the singer's repertoire, but this time the choice to produce the singer's album was Richard Perry who chose songs by contemporary artists such as: Joni Mitchell, Gordon Lightfoot, Harry Nilsson and Laura Nyro.

The album cover photography was taken at Sunrise Mountain, Nevada by Barry Feinstein. When Columbia promoted the singer's next album Barbra Joan Streisand, it announced in magazines that Stoney End is like the artist's first album, given the large number of people who discover her songs since the record. 

The song "Stoney End", composed by Laura Nyro, was released in the US as the lead single and charted at number 6 on the Billboard Hot 100 and number 2 on the Adult Contemporary chart and also reached number 27 on the UK singles chart. "Time and Love" reached Number 51 on the Billboard Hot 100 and number 3 on the AC Chart. "Hands Off the Man", the final single, was officially titled "Flim Flam Man" (and backed with "Maybe"). It spent 5 weeks on the Billboard Hot 100, peaking at 82.

Critical reception

The album received favorable reviews from music critcs. William Ruhlmann, from AllMusic website, has retrospectively given the album four and a half (out of five) stars, and called it "not a perfect album, but it was so far removed from what Streisand's fans and her detractors thought her capable of that it stands as one of her major triumphs". The review also mentioned: "whereas (The Barbra Streisand Album, 1963) had redefined the role of the traditional pop singer in contemporary terms for the early '60s, Stoney End redefined Streisand as an effective pop/rock singer".

Alex Dubo from Rolling Stone gave the album a mixed review which he wrote that "Stoney End runs hot and cold. Some of the cuts are really dynamite and some are holdovers from the days of musical comedies". He also wrote that the album "shows that Barbra Streisand can sing, and could be relevant, although I don't expect droves of rock fans to rush out and buy this".

Commercial performance
The album hit number 10 on the Billboard 200, and was certified Platinum with sales of 1 million copies, in 1986. In the UK the album entered the chart at number 28. It also peaked at #12 in Canada. It peaked #62 in the 1971's Year-end chart of the Cash Box magazine.

Track listing
Side One
 "I Don't Know Where I Stand" (Joni Mitchell)
 "Hands Off the Man (Flim Flam Man)" (Laura Nyro)
 "If You Could Read My Mind" (Gordon Lightfoot)
 "Just a Little Lovin' (Early In The Mornin')" (Barry Mann, Cynthia Weil)
 "Let Me Go" from the Columbia Pictures release Pursuit of Happiness (Randy Newman)
 "Stoney End" (Laura Nyro)

Side Two
 "No Easy Way Down" (Carole King, Gerry Goffin)
 "Time and Love" (Laura Nyro)
 "Maybe" (Harry Nilsson)
 "Free the People" (Barbara Keith)
 "I'll Be Home" (Randy Newman)

Charts

Certifications and sales

Personnel

Barbra Streisand – vocals
Randy Newman – piano on "Let Me Go" and "I'll Be Home"
Larry Carlton, Eric Weissberg, Louie Shelton, David Cohen – guitar
Nickey Barclay – keyboards
Gene Page – arranger
June Millington – guitar 
Hal Blaine, Ron Tutt, Richie Hayward, Earl Palmer – drums
Max Bennett, Joe Osborn, Larry Knechtel – bass guitar
Perry Botkin Jr. – arranger
Claus Ogerman – arranger
Larry Muhoberac, Michel Rubini – keyboards
Richard Perry – guitar, percussion
Milt Holland – percussion
Jackie Ward – background vocals

Toni Wine – background vocals
Jerry Cook – background vocals
Sharone de Vault – background vocals
Sherlie Matthews – background vocals
Clydie King – background vocals
Merry Clayton – background vocals
Venetta Fields – background vocals
Eddie Kendricks – background vocals
Glenna Session – background vocals
Maretha Stewart – background vocals
Technical
Peter Weiss, Rafael Valentin – engineering
Barry Feinstein, Tom Wilkes - design, photography

External links
Barbra Archives – "Stoney End" page.

References

Barbra Streisand albums
1971 albums
Albums arranged by Gene Page
Albums arranged by Perry Botkin Jr.
Albums arranged by Claus Ogerman
Albums produced by Richard Perry
Columbia Records albums